In ancient Hawaii, a luakini temple, or luakini heiau, was a Native Hawaiian sacred place where human and animal blood sacrifices were offered. 

In Hawaiian tradition, luakini heiaus were first established by Paʻao, a legendary priest credited with establishing many of the rites and symbols typical of the stratified high chieftainships of the immediate pre-European-contact period. 

List of currently known or reputed luakini heiaus:

Kauai

 Wailua Complex of Heiaus

Oahu:

 Puu O Mahuka, "Hill of Escape" 

Maui:
 Loaloa Heiau

Big Island of Hawaii: 

 Puukohola National Historic Site
 Mookini, birthplace of Kamehameha I
 Aha'ula (now engulfed by lava)
 Keeku Heiau on Kahaluu Bay

References

 
Hawaiian religion
Sacrifice